The fourth season of Power Couple premiered on Tuesday, April 30, 2019 at 10:30 p.m. on RecordTV.

The show features thirteen celebrity couples living under one roof and facing extreme challenges that will test how well they really know each other. Each week, a couple will be eliminated until the last couple wins the grand prize.

Nicole Bahls & Marcelo Bimbi won the competition with 48.60% of the public vote over Mariana Felício & Daniel Saullo and Clara Maia & André Coelho and took home the R$596.000 prize they accumulated during the show. Mariana & Daniel received R$98.900 (10% of their final jackpot) as the runners-up.

Cast

Couples

Future Appearances

After this season, in 2019, Drika Marinho (from André & Drika) appeared in A Fazenda 11, she finished in 17th place in the competition.

In 2022, André Marinho (from André & Drika) appeared in A Fazenda 14, he finished in 5th place in the competition.

The game
Key

Challenges' results

Notes

Special power
Each week, the couples' challenge winners randomly picked two out of eight boxes from the Tree of Power of the different colors. Then, the couple would be given a choice between two advantages in the game; the couple's choice is marked in bold.

Results

Voting history

Notes

Room status

Ratings and reception

Brazilian ratings
All numbers are in points and provided by Kantar Ibope Media.

References

External links
 Power Couple 4 on R7.com

2019 Brazilian television seasons
Power Couple (Brazilian TV series)